Women have served in the Parliament of Sri Lanka since 1931, and have been represented in all successive parliaments to date. The first woman representative was Adeline Molamure, elected to the State Council, daughter of J. H. Meedeniya and wife of Alfred Francis Molamure, both State Councillors. 60 women have served in the legislature of Sri Lanka, including 13 who are currently serving, constituting over 5% of all current Members.

Women in Parliament, however small in numbers, have held high positions in Parliament and the cabinet. Two women have become Prime Minister and one has gone on to become the President of Sri Lanka. Sirimavo Bandaranaike became the world's first female head of government on 21 July 1960, holding the post for a non-consecutive 17 years. Her daughter, Chandrika Kumaratunga, became Sri Lanka's first modern female head of state and president.

This marked the first time that a female prime minister directly succeeded another female prime minister, and is also the first time that a nation possessed a female prime minister and a female president simultaneously.

The progress of women in Sri Lankan politics, however, has stagnated as expectations are higher for their representation in Parliament.

Number of women

Number of women in Parliament by House
Number of women in the Sri Lankan Parliament (1931–2015):

List of female members
This is a complete list of women who have served as members of the successive Sri Lankan Legislatures, ordered by seniority. This list includes women who served in the past and who continue to serve in the present.

Service

See also
 Parliament of Sri Lanka
 List of female cabinet ministers of Sri Lanka

References

External links
 Lady Members of Parliament

Members of Parliament of Sri Lanka
 
Lists of Sri Lankan politicians